Pede is a surname, and may refer to:

 Hendrik van Pede, architect of Oudenaarde Town Hall, Belgium, in 1526-1537
 Jean Pede (1927-2013), Belgian liberal politician
 Richard Pede, Dean of Hereford from 1463 to 1481
 Yves Apollinaire Pede (born 1959), Vodou artist from Benin

See also
 Enzo Di Pede (born 1957), Italian soccer goalkeeper in the North American Soccer League and the original Major Indoor Soccer League